Epichoristodes incerta is a species of moth of the family Tortricidae. It is found in Madagascar.

References

Archipini
Endemic fauna of Madagascar
Moths described in 1960
Taxa named by Alexey Diakonoff